The 1991–92 Iraqi National Clubs First Division was the 18th season of the competition since its foundation in 1974. The competition started on 3 October 1991 and ended on 26 June 1992. The league title was won by Al-Quwa Al-Jawiya, earning their third Premier League title.

Al-Quwa Al-Jawiya clinched the title on the final day of the season with a 1–0 win against Al-Zawraa, which was controversial due to Al-Zawraa having a goal ruled out for offside that would have won them the league if it was counted. Jawiya also won the Iraq FA Cup in this season to secure their first ever national double. Al-Khutoot (known as Al-Tayaran at the time) made their debut in the top division.

League table

Results

Season statistics

Top scorers

Hat-tricks

Awards
 Top scorer: Ahmed Radhi (Al-Zawraa)
 Best Player/MVP: Saad Qais (Al-Karkh)
 Best Goalkeeper: Emad Hashim (Al-Shorta)
 Best Coach: Adnan Dirjal (Al-Karkh)
 Best Referee: Tariq Ahmed

References

External links
 Iraq Football Association

Iraqi Premier League seasons
1991–92 in Iraqi football
Iraq